Nemophora raddei is a moth of the fairy longhorn moths or Adelidae family. It was described by Hans Rebel in 1901. It is found in Japan.

References

Adelidae
Moths described in 1901
Endemic fauna of Japan
Moths of Japan